Li Dong (born 15 March 2001) is a Chinese footballer who plays as a midfielder for Serbian club Zlatibor Čajetina.

Club career
In August 2019, Li joined Serbian side Metalac Gornji Milanovac, alongside compatriot Chi Jiahong. He made his debut on 20 June 2020, in a 2–0 Serbian First League win over Novi Pazar. He renewed his contract ahead of the 2020–21 Serbian SuperLiga.

Career statistics

Club

Notes

References

2001 births
Living people
Chinese footballers
Association football midfielders
Serbian First League players
FK Metalac Gornji Milanovac players
FK Radnički Sremska Mitrovica players
FK Zlatibor Čajetina players
Chinese expatriate footballers
Chinese expatriate sportspeople in Serbia
Expatriate footballers in Serbia